Esteban Valenzuela García (born 2 September 1948) is a Mexican politician affiliated with the Institutional Revolutionary Party. As of 2014 he served as Deputy of the LIX Legislature of the Mexican Congress representing Sinaloa. He was also Municipal President of Ahome from 1999 to 2001.

References 

1948 births
Living people
People from Sinaloa
Institutional Revolutionary Party politicians
Deputies of the LIX Legislature of Mexico
Members of the Chamber of Deputies (Mexico) for Sinaloa